Trochulus hispidus, previously known as Trichia hispida, common name, the "hairy snail", is a species of air-breathing land snail, a terrestrial pulmonate gastropod mollusk in the family Hygromiidae, the hairy snails and their allies.

Distribution 
This species occurs in a number of European countries and islands including:

Western Europe:
 The British Isles: Great Britain and Ireland
 Netherlands, Belgium, Luxembourg
 Faroe Islands
 France
 Switzerland, Liechtenstein

Northern Europe:
 Denmark, Norway, Sweden, Finland

Central Europe:
 Austria, Germany, Czech Republic, Poland, Slovakia, Hungary, Romania

Southern Europe:
 Andorra, Spain, Italy, Bulgaria

Eastern Europe:
 Moldova
 Estonia, Latvia, Lithuania
 Ukraine
 Russian Federation (Kaliningrad)

Description
The 3-6 x 5-11 mm shell has 5-6 moderately convex whorls which are rounded or very slightly keeled at the periphery. The aperture has a thin white lip inside. The umbilicus is open and usually wide at 1/8-1/4 of shell diameter. In colour the shell is brown to cream, sometimes with a light band at the periphery. The periostracum is irregularly striated, and densely covered with short (0.2-0.3 mm), curved hairs. These hairs usually remain in the umbilicus if worn away from the rest of the shell. Lost hairs leave pronounced scars.

The animal is brownish grey with a darker anterior part.

Anatomy
This species of snail creates and uses love darts before mating. The love dart of this species is thorn-shaped.

Shepeleva (2014) studied eyes of Trochulus hispidus.

Ecology 
The size of the egg is 1.5 mm.

A hairy snail was found in the plumage of a great tit (Parus major) wintering in southwestern Poland in 2010. This passerine was the smallest bird species reported to carry a gastropod.

References

Further reading 
 Dépraz A., Hausser J. & Pfenninger M. (2009). "A species delimitation approach in the Trochulus sericeus/hispidus complex reveals two cryptic species within a sharp contact zone". BMC Evolutionary Biology 2009(9): 171. 
 Kruckenhauser L., Duda M., Bartel D., Sattmann H., Harl J., Kirchner S. & Haring E. (2014). "Paraphyly and budding speciation in the hairy snail (Pulmonata, Hygromiidae)". Zoologica Scripta, 43(3): 273-288. .
 Proćków M. & Kuźnik-Kowalska E. (2016). "Major fitness components in life history of euryoecious land snail Trochulus hispidus (Linnaeus, 1758)(Gastropoda: Hygromiidae)". Folia Malacologica 24: 179-184. . PDF

External links 

 Trochulus hispidus as Trichia hispida images at Encyclopedia of Life  

Fauna of Switzerland
Hygromiidae
Gastropods described in 1758
Taxa named by Carl Linnaeus